Jack Millen (25 July 1900 – 9 March 1978) was  a former Australian rules footballer who played with Fitzroy in the Victorian Football League (VFL).

Notes

External links 

1900 births
1978 deaths
Australian rules footballers from Melbourne
Fitzroy Football Club players
People from Carlton North, Victoria